or  is a small lake in Tromsø Municipality in Troms og Finnmark county, Norway. The lake sits at the highest point on the central part of the island of Tromsøya inside the city of Tromsø. Prestvannet was built up as a reservoir in 1867, and continued in that role until 1921. Since then it has been used as park land and a nature reserve.

The pond area has been preserved as a nesting place for various birds. The pond and its surrounding wooded area form an important natural area for the Tromsø area. Encircling the pond is a track commonly used for recreational activities and sports, as well as a nature trail with plaques giving information about the local wildlife. In the winter, the frozen pond is a popular place for ice skating.

Media gallery

References

Tromsø
Reservoirs in Norway
Lakes of Troms og Finnmark